Daning River may refer to the following rivers in China:

Daning River (Chongqing)
Daning River (Guangxi)